Prem is a brand of canned meat similar to Spam first introduced in 1939 by the original Swift & Company in the United States. The brand is currently owned by Zwanenberg Food Group USA.  In Canada, Prem continues to be sold under the Swift umbrella brand and both trademarks are currently owned by Maple Leaf Foods. Prem was shipped to England during World War II.

See also
 Potted meat
 Treet

References

Brand name meats
Canned food
Canned meat
Food processing